Dave Llorens is a three-time entrepreneur and was the founder and CEO of the solar financing aggregator 1BOG (One Block Off the Grid) from 2008 to 2012. This startup was featured in the Peter Byck documentary Carbon Nation. In 2009 the company accounted for a quarter of all solar installations in the San Francisco Bay area.

Llorens also started SolarPowerRocks.com, a website that consolidates information on solar grants and incentives by state. He is a co-founder of 60-day MBA. As well, Llorens contributes to the Huffington Post and to Fast Company.

1BOG
The company has put the cost of residential solar technology within the reach of many more families than before and thereby increased the adoption of solar technology first in San Francisco, then in California, then in many cities nationwide. Every location has its own protocol for metering, permits and rebates, says Llorens once told The Wall Street Journal. Solving this confusion is the mission of 1BOG.

"We serve as a conduit between the consumer companies, and finance companies in 40 states and growing," Llorens said in an interview. "With no pressure, we can do a complete consultation over the phone, including remote design services to suit their needs. From there, we can match them with a local company." As another 1BOG executive said to Venture Beat, "It's that difference between paying about $10,000 and just a thousand up front."

1BOG is an important example of social entrepreneurship, in which a company discovers a way to make a good profit while promoting social activism and community development, or otherwise making the world a better place. It is also one of the more successful, making its money on economies of scale and payments from installers.

See also 

 American Solar Energy Society
 List of photovoltaics companies
 National Renewable Energy Laboratory
 Renewable energy in the United States
 Solar Energy Industries Association

References

External links
SolarPowerRocks.com
Women Didn't Buy Smokes in the '20s for the Same Reason People Don't Buy Solar Power Today
Solyndra Was Lame and Failed, But That's Not the End of Solar
 60-Day MBA
 Plus-One This: Proof That Google Plus Will Prevail
 The Future Of Google Plus, And Its Path To Social-Media Domination

Solar energy in the United States
American technology company founders
Economy of the San Francisco Bay Area
Businesspeople from the San Francisco Bay Area
Living people
Year of birth missing (living people)